The Shirshov Ridge is located on the eastern border of the Commander Basin below  the Kamchatka Peninsula. It extends directly southward for a distance of 750 km toward the Aleutian arc in the eastern part of the Bering Sea (see figure).

The Shirshov Ridge rises 2–2.5 km above the surrounding basins. Although not immediately evident from the morphology, the Shirshov Ridge southern end extends to meet the northwesternmost portion of Bowers Ridge. The continuity is evident in structural maps of basement rocks, in magnetic surveys, and in free air gravity field surveys.  The connection has been distorted by a sinistral shear fault, which has displaced the point of connection by ~350 km.

See also
Olyutor Range

References

Underwater ridges of the Bering Sea